Dangerous is an Australian television drama series that first screened on 16 January 2007 on FOX8 and was shown in Ireland on RTÉ One. In mid-2008, it began running on The WB's online network in the US.

It features a "Romeo and Juliet" story of forbidden love, set against the culturally diverse backgrounds of Sydney's western suburbs street crime and the affluence of Sydney's eastern suburbs. It explores youth culture, including taboo subjects like party drug use and the underground world of drag racing and ramraiding. Dangerous is produced by John Edwards and Imogen Banks. Writers include Fiona Seres and Brendan Cowell, acclaimed for their work on Love My Way. It is directed by David Caesar and Shawn Seet. The series' theme song is "Set The Record Straight", performed by New Zealand hip hop group Fast Crew, although the lyrics "Auckland City, let's go" has been changed to "Sydney City, let's go" for use on the show.

Cast
 Khan Chittenden as Dean
 Brooke Satchwell as Donna McCarthy
 Joel Edgerton as Detective Mark Field
 Robert Mammone as Craig Lukovic
 Paul Pantano as Joe
 Nicole da Silva as Erica "EC" Eulestra
 Vico Thai as Phu "Riz" Nguyen
 Jack Finsterer as Nathan Walsh
 Steve Rodgers as Brendan
 Katie Wall as Esther
 Jackson Edwards as Kale
 Gabrielle Scollay as Catriona Lukovic
 Kieran Darcy-Smith as Garry
 Trent Dalzell as Jock
 Jess Levett as Tiane
 David Dowell as Daryl
 Waddah Sari as Vinnie

Episodes
(Episode information retrieved from Australian Television Information Archive).

Cars

See also
 List of Australian television series

References

External links
 Foxtel
 FOX8 Official Website
 Southern Star
 Dangerous Website
 Dangerous Myspace Fan site

Fox8 original programming
2007 Australian television series debuts
2000s Australian drama television series
2007 Australian television series endings
Television shows set in Sydney
Television series by Endemol Australia